"Superhero" is a 1997 song by Danish Eurodance band Daze, released as the first single from their double platinum debut album, Super Heroes (1997). It was very successful in Scandinavia, peaking at number two in Denmark, Finland and Norway. In Sweden, it narrowly missed the top 10, reaching number 11. The single became one of the fastest selling singles of 1997 in Denmark and has sold both gold and platinum all over Scandinavia.

Critical reception
AllMusic editor Stephen Thomas Erlewine noted that "Superhero", compared to Aqua's "Barbie Girl", was "quite similar to that slice of relentlessly catchy and danceable Europop". Larry Flick from Billboard wrote, "Is there still a little steam left in the Euro-NRG movement? When the material is as giddy and catchy as this, you bet. This exuberant trio—fronted by the chirpy Bix and helmed by the producers behind Aqua—speeds through a rave-ish groove and a sea of cotton-candy synths. Bix is not an extraordinary vocalist, but she's several notches above her European contemporaries, vamping with notable dexterity and confidence. The hook is sticky good fun and perfect car-radio fodder. Expect it to be blasting from rhythm-crossover and top 40 stations well into the early summer season." Gerald Martinez from New Straits Times described it as a "bouncy and catchy dance tune" in his review of Super Heroes.

Chart performance
"Superhero" was very successful on the charts especially in Scandinavia, where it reached number two in Denmark, Finland and Norway. The song was also a top 20 hit in Sweden and a top 30 hit in the Netherlands. In the United Kingdom, it peaked at number 76 in its first week at the UK Singles Chart, on May 17, 1998. On the Eurochart Hot 100, it reached its highest chart position as number 91 in October 1997. Outside Europe, "Superhero" charted in both New Zealand and the United States, peaking at number 42 and 88.

Music video
There were made two different music videos for the song. The second version was later published on YouTube in February 2018. By September 2020, it had more than 3 million views.

Track listing

Charts

Weekly charts

Year-end charts

Covers
Russian metal cover project Even Blurry Videos released their version of the song on YouTube in January 2019.

References

1997 debut singles
1997 songs
Daze songs